WBFK (91.1 FM) is a radio station licensed to serve the community of Hiseville, Kentucky. The station is owned by Bethel Fellowship, Inc., and airs a Christian radio format. It functions as a fulltime repeater of WBFI in McDaniels, Kentucky.

History
The station was assigned the WBFK call letters by the Federal Communications Commission on August 14, 2012.

References

External links
 Official Website
 FCC Public Inspection File for WBFK
 

Radio stations established in 2012
2012 establishments in Kentucky
BFK
Barren County, Kentucky